Slave collar may refer to:
 Collar used to identify and discipline slaves
 Collar (BDSM), collar used in bondage

See also
Page (occupation)
Representation of slavery in European art
Slave iron bit